J. G. Anschütz GmbH & Co. KG is a sporting firearms manufacturer based in Ulm, Germany, that makes rimfire and centerfire rifles as well as air rifles and air pistols for target and competition shooting, as well as hunting.  Anschütz rifles are used by many competitive shooters participating in the Summer Olympics 50 meter rifle events and is the maker of the standard biathlon rifle used at the Winter Olympics.

The ahg-Anschütz company (a "twin" company from J. G. Anschütz) is mostly dedicated to the international trade of shooting accessories like shooting jackets and boots.

J. G. Anschütz company is also the major shareholder of the Austrian target firearms manufacturer Steyr Sportwaffen GmbH.

Models

Current models 

Biathlon rifles (.22 LR)
 64 Biathlon (bolt action)
 Fortner 1727 Biathlon (straight pull) (discontinued)
 Fortner 1827 Biathlon (straight pull)
 Laserpower III training rifle

Both the 1727 and 1827 are produced by System Fortner under licence from Anschütz. The Fortner rifles are currently the most used biathlon rifles in Olympic competitions. The 1727 and 1827 share the same action, and the main upgrade with the 1827 model was a different stock and barrel. The straight pull mechanism uses 6 ball bearings to lock the bolt.

Small bore match rifles (.22 LR)
 54.30
 F27
 1903
 1907
 1913

Match air rifles (4.5mm)
 9015

Straight pull hunting models
 1727 (.17 HMR and .22 LR)

Bolt action hunting models
 65 MP (.22 LR)
 1416 (.22 LR)
 1441/42 (.22 LR)
 1516 (.22 WMR)
 1517 (.17 HMR)
 1710 (.22 LR)
 1712 (.22 LR)
 1761 (.22 LR, .17 HMR, .22 WMR)
 1771 (4.6x30, .17 Hornet, .204 Ruger, .222 Rem, .223 Rem, .300 BLK)

References

Listing of Anschutz owners manuals

External links

Anschütz North America website

Companies based in Baden-Württemberg
Anschutz